Olivia Madison Savvas (born 1996) is an Australian politician. She has been a Labor member of the South Australian House of Assembly since the 2022 state election, representing Newland. She replaced the Liberal politician, Richard Harvey, who had held the seat since 2018.

Savvas attended high school as Saint Ignatius' College. Savvas studied law and politics at Adelaide University, and worked as an analyst in a major bank focusing on counter-terrorism finance. Her family originates from the Greek island of Samos.

Savvas served three years as a councillor representing the Balmoral Ward on the City of Tea Tree Gully Council, taking leave of absence to campaign for Newland. Elected at age 25, she will be the youngest member of the South Australian Parliament and is the youngest woman ever elected to the House of Assembly.

References 

1996 births
Living people
Members of the South Australian House of Assembly
South Australian local councillors
University of Adelaide alumni
Australian people of Greek descent
Women members of the South Australian House of Assembly
21st-century Australian politicians
21st-century Australian women politicians